Rakep Patel (born 12 July 1989) was a Kenyan international cricketer. A product of the Nairobi Gymkhana Club, he was a Wicket-Keeper–Batsman who played right-handed, but also occasionally bowled off spin.

Career
He made his lone performance for the Kenya Select team in their inaugural season, and found himself called up to the national squad for their tour of Europe, including a tour of the Netherlands and the 2009 ICC World Twenty20 Qualifier.

He has the joint record along with Dawid Malan for scoring the highest ever T20 score when batting at number 6 position (103).

In January 2018, he was named as captain of Kenya's squad for the 2018 ICC World Cricket League Division Two tournament. However, Kenya finished in sixth and last place in the tournament and were relegated to Division Three. As a result, Patel resigned as captain of the Kenyan team.

In September 2018, he was named in Kenya's squad for the 2018 Africa T20 Cup. The following month, he was named in Kenya's squad for the 2018 ICC World Cricket League Division Three tournament in Oman.

In May 2019, he was named in Kenya's squad for the Regional Finals of the 2018–19 ICC T20 World Cup Africa Qualifier tournament in Uganda. He was the leading run-scorer for Kenya in the Regional Finals, with 106 runs in three matches.

In September 2019, he was named in Kenya's squad for the 2019 ICC T20 World Cup Qualifier tournament in the United Arab Emirates. In November 2019, he was named in Kenya's squad for the Cricket World Cup Challenge League B tournament in Oman. In October 2021, he was named in Kenya's squad for the Regional Final of the 2021 ICC Men's T20 World Cup Africa Qualifier tournament in Rwanda.

References

External links

1989 births
Living people
Cricketers from Nairobi
Kenyan cricketers
Northern Nomads cricketers
Kenyan people of Indian descent
Kenya One Day International cricketers
Kenya Twenty20 International cricketers
Gujarati people
Kenyan Hindus
Cricketers at the 2011 Cricket World Cup
Kenyan cricket captains
Wicket-keepers